Lennis Murray Speck (born August 23, 1929) was a Canadian professional hockey player who played 10 seasons for the Clinton Comets in the Eastern Hockey League. He was an EHL first team all star in 1962, 1964, 1965, 1966, 1968 and 1969.

External links
 

1929 births
Living people
Sportspeople from Kirkland Lake
Ice hockey people from Ontario
Clinton Comets players
Canadian expatriate ice hockey players in the United States
Canadian ice hockey defencemen